The Meixian dialect (Pha̍k-fa-sṳ: Mòi-yan-fa;), also known as Moiyan dialect, as well as Meizhou dialect, or Jiaying dialect and Sixian dialect (in Taiwan), is the prestige dialect of Hakka Chinese. It is named after Meixian District, Guangdong.

Phonology

Initials

There are two series of stops and affricates in Hakka, both voiceless: tenuis // and aspirated //.

* When the initials // , // , // , and //  are followed by a palatal medial // , they become [] , [] , [] , and [] , respectively.

Rimes 

Finals

Moreover, Hakka finals exhibit the final consonants found in Middle Chinese, namely  which are romanised as m, n, ng, b, d, and g respectively in the official Moiyan romanisation.

Tone

Moiyan Hakka has six tones. The Middle Chinese fully voiced initial syllables became aspirated voiceless initial syllable in Hakka. Before that happened, the four Middle Chinese 'tones', ping, shang, qu, ru, underwent a voicing split in the case of ping and ru, giving the dialect six tones in traditional accounts.

These so-called yin-yang tonal splittings developed mainly as a consequence of the type of initial a Chinese syllable had during the Middle Chinese stage in the development of Chinese, with voiceless initial syllables  tending to become of the yin type, and the voiced initial syllables  developing into the yang type. In modern Moiyan Hakka however, part of the Yin Ping tone characters have sonorant initials  originally from the Middle Chinese Shang tone syllables and fully voiced Middle Chinese Qu tone characters, so the voiced/voiceless distinction should be taken only as a rule of thumb.

Hakka tone contours differs more as one moves away from Moiyen.

Entering tone
Hakka preserves all of the entering tones of Middle Chinese and it is split into two registers. Meixian has the following:

 陰入 [ ˩ ] a low pitched checked tone
 陽入 [ ˥ ] a high pitched checked tone

Middle Chinese entering tone syllables ending in [k] whose vowel clusters have become front high vowels like [i] and [e] shifts to syllables with [t] finals in modern Hakka as seen in the following table.

Tone sandhi

For Moiyan Hakka, the yin ping and qu tone characters exhibit sandhi when the following character has a lower pitch. These are shown in red in the following table.

The neutral tone occurs in some postfixes. It has a mid pitch.

Internal variation 

The Meixian dialect can be divided into four accents, which are:

Meicheng accent: Most of the townships in the central part of Meixian County (including present-day Meijiang District)

Songkou accent: Songkou, Longwen, Taoyao.

Meixi accent: Meixi.

Shejiang River accent: Shejiang River in the southwest of Meixian County.

References

Further reading
 

Hakka Chinese
Meizhou